Großschönau is a municipality in the district Görlitz, in Saxony, Germany located in the cross-border region with the Czech Republic. It used to be a famous Upper Lusatian center of Damask fabric production until the end of the 1980s. Since then it has turned into an area of tourism.

In Großschönau is the historical sylvan lido Trixi Park, a spa which was expanded with indoor swimming pools, a sauna, camping ground and holiday flats. The town is a child-friendly starting point for hikers and cyclists alike who want to explore both sides of the Czech-German border area with its relatively attractive price level. Mount Lausche (793 m) is situated in the community of Waltersdorf and marks the highest peak of the Lusatian Mountains.

Transport 
A road connects German Großschönau with its Czech neighboring city of Varnsdorf. The railway station of Grossschönau offers tri-national connections to Poland, the Czech Republic and Germany as the existing track runs through all three countries of the Euroregion. As all countries are members of the Schengen Area, all border checkpoints have been eliminated.

Residents development

Residents of note 
 Johann Eleazar Zeissig, known as Schenau (17371806), German artist

References 

Populated places in Görlitz (district)
Czech Republic–Germany border crossings
Zittau Mountains